Dennis Port (or Dennisport) is a census-designated place (CDP) in the town of Dennis in Barnstable County, Cape Cod, Massachusetts. At the 2010 census, its population was 3,162.

The Swan Pond River and Upper County Road demarcate Dennis Port's western border with West Dennis. The village of West Harwich lies directly to Dennis Port's east, with the border demarcated by the median of Division Street. To the north of Dennis Port is South Dennis. Like other villages along Nantucket Sound, Dennis Port features warm-water beaches, like Haigis Beach, Sea Street Beach, and Glendon Road Beach. Many consider these among Cape Cod's most desirable beaches for swimming and windsurfing.

By U.S. standards, real estate prices in Dennis Port remain high. Housing stock consists mostly of World War II–era beach cottages built in the Cape Cod architectural style, although many have been expanded or replaced with larger, more contemporary beach houses. Many streets in Dennis Port—particularly those south of Lower County Road, within  of the beaches—evoke the quaint ambience of an early-20th century seasonal retreat. There are a great deal of hotels, cottage retreats, and businesses geared towards tourists.

Famous residents of Dennis Port include U.S. military hero Benjamin F. Baker.

Geography
Dennis Port is located at  (41.663779, -70.136576).

Dennis Port is said by locals to be a part of the Lower Cape Cod region unlike the rest of Dennis villages.

Demographics

As of the census of 2000, there were 3,612 people, 1,719 households, and 943 families residing in the CDP. The population density was 455.8/km2 (1,181.3/mi2). There were 4,369 housing units at an average density of 551.3/km2 (1,428.9/mi2). The racial makeup of the CDP was 90.03% White, 4.90% African American, 0.36% Native American, 0.39% Asian, 1.74% from other races, and 2.57% from two or more races. Hispanic or Latino of any race were 2.99% of the population.

There were 1,719 households, out of which 20.4% had children under the age of 18 living with them, 39.6% were married couples living together, 11.9% had a female householder with no husband present, and 45.1% were non-families. 37.9% of all households were made up of individuals, and 16.8% had someone living alone who was 65 years of age or older. The average household size was 2.06 and the average family size was 2.68.

In the CDP, the population was spread out, with 17.9% under the age of 18, 6.2% from 18 to 24, 28.1% from 25 to 44, 24.2% from 45 to 64, and 23.6% who were 65 years of age or older. The median age was 43 years. For every 100 females, there were 87.3 males. For every 100 females age 18 and over, there were 84.2 males.

The median income for a household in the CDP was $36,518, and the median income for a family was $41,525. Males had a median income of $36,568 versus $29,398 for females. The per capita income for the CDP was $23,872. About 10.5% of families and 10.7% of the population were below the poverty line, including 19.6% of those under age 18 and 6.1% of those age 65 or over.

Notable people
 Susan H. Wixon (1839-1912), freethought writer, editor, feminist, and educator

References

External links
 Dennis Public Library

Census-designated places in Barnstable County, Massachusetts
Census-designated places in Massachusetts
Dennis, Massachusetts
Populated coastal places in Massachusetts